Anjuli Knäsche (born 18 October 1993) is a former German athlete who competed in pole vault events in international level events. Her highest achievement is tied fourth place with Kira Grünberg at the 2012 World Junior Championships in Athletics in Barcelona.

References

1993 births
Living people
People from Preetz
German female pole vaulters
Sportspeople from Schleswig-Holstein